Sarcocephalus is a genus of flowering plants in the family Rubiaceae. It holds two species of shrubs or trees native to tropical Africa. Sarcocephalus latifolius has edible fruits known as African peach, Guinea peach, Sierra Leone peach or country fig.

Species
 Sarcocephalus latifolius (Sm.) E.A.Bruce
 Sarcocephalus pobeguinii Hua ex Pobég.
 Sarcocephalus esculentus

References

External links

World Checklist of Rubiaceae

Fruits originating in Africa
Rubiaceae genera
Naucleeae